Adrian Hamsted was the eponymous Dutch founder of the sect of Adrianists.

He was born at Dordrecht in 1524; died at Bruges in 1581. We know nothing of his personal history, and very little concerning the short-lived sect to which he gave his name. The Adrianists, who were mostly women, professed in general the Protestant doctrines of the Anabaptists; but what their specific beliefs were cannot be ascertained. Charges of immorality have been named against them, but have never been proved.

Sources

1524 births
1581 deaths
People from Dordrecht